The 2020–21 Sarajevo season was the club's 72nd season in existence, and their 27th consecutive season in the top flight of Bosnian football, the Premier League of BiH. Besides competing in the Premier League, the team competed in the National Cup as well. Sarajevo also competed in the qualifications for the UEFA Champions League and the qualifications for the UEFA Europa League.

In that season Sarajevo won the cup title. The club qualified to the 2021–22 UEFA Europa Conference League qualifying rounds.

Squad information

First-team squad

(C)

(Captain)

(C)

Transfers

Transfers in

Transfers out

Loans out

Kit

Friendlies

Pre-season

Mid-season

Competitions

Overview

Premier League

League table

Results summary

Results by round

Matches

Cup of Bosnia and Herzegovina

Round of 32

Round of 16

Quarter-finals

Semi-finals

Final

UEFA Champions League

Sarajevo entered the UEFA Champions League at the first qualifying round.

First qualifying round

Second qualifying round

UEFA Europa League

Sarajevo entered the UEFA Europa League at the third qualifying round.

Third qualifying round

Play-off round

Statistics

Squad appearances and goals

|-
! colspan="14" style="background:#dcdcdc; text-align:center"|Goalkeepers

|-
!colspan="14" style="background:#dcdcdc; text-align:center"|Defenders

|-
!colspan="14" style="background:#dcdcdc; text-align:center"|Midfielders

|-
!colspan="14" style="background:#dcdcdc; text-align:center"|Forwards

|-
! colspan=14 style=background:#dcdcdc; text-align:center|Players who have made an appearance this season but have left the club

|}
Number after the "+" sign represents the number of games player started the game on the bench and was substituted on.

Disciplinary record
Includes all competitive matches and only players that got booked throughout the season. The list is sorted by shirt number, and then position.

Goalscorers

Clean sheets

Notes

References

External links

FK Sarajevo seasons
Sarajevo
2020–21 UEFA Champions League participants seasons
2020–21 UEFA Europa League participants seasons